Quail Island is an island in the Northern Territory of Australia in the Beagle Gulf about  from the territory capital of Darwin.

Quail Island belongs to the Quail Island Group.  The other two islands in the archipelago are Bare Sand Island (southwest of Quail Island) and Djadjalbit Island (south).

The islands are known for being a breeding ground for flatback turtles.

History
On 9 October 1881 when SS Brisbane, an 85.8 metres long passenger, cargo and mail ship, built by A & J Inglis, Pointhouse, Glasgow, struck the nearby Fish Reef, while heading there with cargo from Hong Kong.

Quail Island Air Weapons Range
The Quail Island Air Weapons Range was used a training ground for defense forces from 1945 to 1979.  There are large munitions scattered around the island as a result.  A three-year clean-up began in 2011 to remove hazards such as unexploded ordnance.  Visitors such as tourists and recreational anglers have been banned from the islands during the clean-up process.

See also

List of islands of Australia

References

Islands of the Northern Territory
Timor Sea